Hand to hand might mean

 Hand-to-hand combat, a fighting discipline
 Hand to hand acrobatics, a balancing skill
Hand to Hand (album), 1980 jazz album